The 1968 United States presidential election in Illinois was held on November 5, 1968, as part of the 1968 United States presidential election. State voters chose 26 electors to represent the state in the Electoral College, which chose the president and vice president.

Background
After having been strongly Republican during the “System of 1896” apart from a few areas in the southern part of the state that had sympathised with the Confederacy during the American Civil War, Illinois became a critical swing state throughout the New Deal era, having voted for the winner of every presidential election since 1920.

Like other states in the Midwest, Illinois had been severely affected by racial tension during the presidency of Lyndon Johnson, which had allowed Charles H. Percy to gain a comfortable Senate win in by defeating Democrat Paul Douglas, in spite of the fact that Illinois, especially the Metro East, was affected less than states to its east.

Turnout
Turnout in the preference vote of the primaries was 0.67%, with a total of 34,241 votes cast.

Turnout in the general election was 81.39%, with a total of 4,619,749 votes cast.

Primaries
Both major parties held non-binding state-run preferential primaries on June 11. All candidates were write-ins.

Democratic

The 1968 Illinois Democratic presidential primary was held on June 11, 1968 in the U.S. state of Illinois as one of the Democratic Party's state primaries ahead of the 1968 presidential election.

The preference vote was a "beauty contest". Delegates were instead selected by direct-vote in each congressional districts on delegate candidates.

While he received 33.66% of the vote, Ted Kennedy was not an active candidate for the nomination. The primary occurred the week after his brother Robert F. Kennedy (who had been running for president) was assassinated. Additionally, while he still received some votes, incumbent president Lyndon B. Johnson had already ruled himself out for the nomination.

Republican

The 1968 Illinois Republican presidential primary was held on June 11, 1968 in the U.S. state of Illinois as one of the Republican Party's state primaries ahead of the 1968 presidential election.

In this election, all candidates were write-ins.

The preference vote was a "beauty contest". Delegates were instead selected by direct-vote in each congressional districts on delegate candidates.

General election
By the time the election campaign was in full swing at the end of the summer, Democratic nominee and incumbent Vice-President Hubert Humphrey was clearly in serious trouble, and early polling suggested he would have little chance in the state. Humphrey was further hindered by the refusal of Chicago Mayor Richard Daley Sr. to help him.

The failure of Nixon’s “50 State Strategy” in 1960 led him to focus on a few electoral-vote-rich states, of which Illinois was one of the most critical. Humphrey lost further in polling during September, and at tend of the first week of October Nixon had a substantial lead. Nevertheless, when the Vice-President campaigned alongside rival former and future Alabama Governor George Wallace, he would gain sharply so that state became extremely close at the beginning of November.

Results
Republican candidate Richard Nixon won the state of Illinois by a narrow margin of 2.93%. The winning of Illinois was the moment that sealed a close and turbulent election for Nixon, who in the last counting did much better in massively populated Cook County than Goldwater or Nixon himself in 1960.

Nixon won ninety of Illinois’ 102 counties, with Humphrey winning only Cook and St. Clair Counties with absolute majorities, although he carried several other Metro East and southern Illinois counties where he was helped by the backing of unions and a strong vote for Wallace taking much Nixon support. Wallace’s segregationism also went down very poorly in many cities of that latter urban region.

Nixon's victory was the first of six consecutive Republican victories in the state, as Illinois would not vote for a Democratic candidate again until Bill Clinton in 1992. Since then it has become a safe Democratic state.

Nixon became the first ever Republican to win the White House without carrying Rock Island County, as well as the first to do so without carrying Macon County since Abraham Lincoln in 1860, the first to do so without carrying Pulaski County since Ulysses S. Grant in 1868, the first to do so without carrying Alexander or Cook Counties since Rutherford B. Hayes in 1876, the first to do so without carrying Fulton County since Benjamin Harrison in 1888, and the first to do so without carrying Christian County since William Howard Taft in 1908.

Results by county

See also
 United States presidential elections in Illinois

Notes

References

United States presidential
Illinois
1968